Insulin-like growth factor-binding protein 4 is a protein that in humans is encoded by the IGFBP4 gene.

Function 

This gene is a member of the insulin-like growth factor binding protein (IGFBP) family and encodes a protein with an IGFBP domain and a thyroglobulin type-I domain. The protein binds both insulin-like growth factors (IGFs) I and II and circulates in the plasma in both glycosylated and non-glycosylated forms. Binding of this protein prolongs the half-life of the IGFs and alters their interaction with cell surface receptors.
IGFBP-4 is a unique protein and it consistently inhibits several cancer cells in vivo and in vitro. Its inhibitory action has been shown in vivo in prostate and colon. It is secreted by all colon cancer cells.

Clinical significance 

The protein itself does not prevent the formation of cancer. However it may reduce the growth of cancer and act as an apoptotic factor.

Interactions 

IGFBP4 has been shown to interact with Insulin-like growth factor 1 and 2.

References

Further reading